Sir Samuel Hordern  (24 September 1876 – 3 June 1956) was an Australian businessman, animal breeder and philanthropist. Born into the prominent Sydney trading family, Hordern directed the family company of Anthony Hordern & Sons from 1909 to 1926.

Early years
Samuel Hordern was born on 24 September 1876 at Retford Hall, Darling Point in Sydney, the eldest son of Samuel Hordern and Jane Maria Booth. His father was the grandson of Anthony Hordern I, who established the eponymous store as a drapery shop in 1823, and his mother was the daughter of prominent Sydney produce merchant and later Alderman, John Booth. Educated at Sydney Grammar School and Bath College in England, Hordern returned to Sydney in 1895 to take up employment in the family business. On 4 March 1900, Hordern married Charlotte Isabel Annie See, daughter of Premier Sir John See, at St Jude's Anglican Church, Randwick and they had one son and two daughters. In the same month, Hordern purchased the 1890 Federation Arts & Crafts house, "Tuxedo", in Albert Road, Strathfield, which became the family's residence until July 1914 when Hordern sold it for £3500.

Anthony Hordern & Sons
On the death of his father in August 1909, in accordance with his father's will, Hordern took over management of the family company, which employed more than 4000 people in its store and mail-order business and imported, manufactured and sold a vast range of merchandise. In 1910, Hordern purchased the 1837 Darling Point mansion, "Mount Adelaide", from the family of Henry Mort, and commissioned architects Morrow & De Putron to design and build a Federation Arts & Crafts mansion, which he named "Babworth House" and which became his family's primary residence from 1915 until his death in 1956.

Hordern publicly listed the company in 1912 and restructured it in 1920. Hordern retired from the business in 1926, when he sold it to a public limited liability company for the sum of AU£2,900,000, described at the time as the "largest business sale that has ever taken place in the history of Australia".

Later career and philanthropy
Hordern was a director of the Australian Mutual Provident Society, from 1915, and was its Chairman for fifteen years, until 1947.

He was a keen cattle, dog and horse breeder, and owner of racehorses, including the 1919 Melbourne Cup winner 'Artilleryman'. Hordern was knighted in 1919, received the King George V Silver Jubilee Medal (1935) and the King George VI Coronation Medal (1937), and was made a Knight Commander of the Order of the British Empire (KBE) in the 1938 Birthday Honours.

Hordern was president of the Royal Agricultural Society of New South Wales (1915-1941) and developed the Sydney Royal Easter Show into a major national event. Prominent in the Sydney Chamber of Commerce and many other business associations, he was a director of the Commonwealth Bank of Australia, president of the Master Retailers' Association, and chairman of the Australian Mutual Provident Society (1932–1947).

On 1 December 1917 Hordern purchased on behalf on an interested group of benefactors, the former vice-regal residence, Cranbrook in Bellevue Hill, from the Government of New South Wales for a Church of England boys' school and contributed towards the establishment in 1926 of a Church of England girls' school in the same area: Kambala School. He was a director of Royal Prince Alfred Hospital (1913–1939) and served as chairman of the hospital board in 1933–1934.

Later life and legacy
The Hordern Pavilion at the Sydney Showgrounds was built in 1924 to commemorate the Hordern family business and Hordern's long-standing role as president of the Royal Agricultural Society. Cape Hordern (originally "Hordern Island") in Antarctica was named after him by Douglas Mawson of the 1911–1914 Australasian Antarctic Expedition to honour his philanthropic support of the expedition. Hordern died age 79 on the same day as his sister, Jane, at his Darling Point residence, "Babworth House", on 3 June 1956. Following his death in 1956 the contents of Babworth House were sold at auction and the mansion was sold to a trust to become a hospital.

References

1876 births
1956 deaths
Australian businesspeople in retailing
Businesspeople from Sydney
Australian Knights Bachelor
Australian Knights Commander of the Order of the British Empire
People educated at Sydney Grammar School
Commonwealth Bank people
Horden family